Al-Ghamdi (also transliterated as Alghamdi, Ghamdi, or Ghamidi) is an Arabic family name denoting a member of the Ghamd tribe of Saudi Arabia.

 The history of Ghamd goes back to the pre-Islamic era, and many members of Ghamd joined the forces of the early Muslim empire. The Alghamdi tribe belongs to the same root, Azd, as Al-Ansar. Al-Ansar are the two tribes which inhabited Madina, named Banu Khazraj and the Banu Aus, sheltered, supported, and fought with Muhammad  in the early days of Islam when he and his early companions from Mecca had to leave it for Madina. Many members of Alghamdi tribe were companions of Muhammad and fought with him. Like most other tribes in the Hejaz region of the country, Ghamd is divided into three large groups, based on geography and lifestyle: the mountaineers (Hejaz) in the central highlands of Al-Baha, the bedouins (badyah) in the desert regions in Najd east of Hejaz, also in some parts of Bisha in Asir Region, and the tohm who inhabit the narrow plain of Tihama on the Red Sea coast.

Pre-Islamic Arabia
There is no doubt that Ghamid is one of the oldest and largest tribes of the Arabian Peninsula, and one of the few tribes that have been known by name and tribal presence since pre-Islamic times until the present time, and the tribe is still in its homes. The Islamic conquests had a great impact on changing the demographics of the tribes of the Arabian Peninsula, and Ghamid is one of the tribes that was affected by this Arab-Islamic tide, so many of her sons went to the Islamic frontiers for jihad, and many of them migrated to the Islamic cities, east and west, and the news of most of the tribe’s leaving the land of Hijaz disappeared.

When Abraha the Abyssinian passed along the lands of Al-Azd on his way to Mecca to demolish the Kaaba, he sent cavalry to conquer the Azd tribes, but Ghamid tribe confronted them, and defeated the cavalries.

The most prominent battles of Ghamid in pre-Islamic Arabia :

1- The battle of Dhi Ghalef: and they had it against  Lahab tribe: Lahab was a great tribe of Al-Azd. It ended with the victory of Ghamdi tribe.

2-The battle of al'ahsiba: against  rijal alhajar tribes. It ended with the victory of Ghamdi tribe.

3-The battle of Yawm Haraq: against Rijal alhajar tribes. It ended with the victory of ghamdi tribe.

4-The battle of Yawm Thram: against rijal alhajar tribes. It ended with the victory of Ghamdi tribe.

5-The battle of Yawm Duqa: against rijal alhajar tribes. It ended with the victory of Ghamdi tribe.

6-The battle of Eyiar: against rijal alhajar tribes. It ended with the victory of Ghamdi tribe.

History
The tribe is of Hejaz, it is considered the oldest tribe of Arabia according to genes examinations and ancient books, Ghamid members ruled many countries along history such as Iran, Egypt, Iraq, Island of Arabia, and Jorden. Ghamid is closely related to the neighboring tribe of Zahran. The history of Ghamd goes back to the pre-Islamic era, and many members of Ghamd joined the forces of the early Muslim empire. Like most other Azdtribes. The tribes historical location is in the region of Al-Bahah in southwestern of Hejaz region, and Najd in the east. It also have parts in Iraq, Jorden, Oman, Sudan, Egypt, Emirates, Yemen, and many other countries.

Here is a list of battles Al-Ghamdi tribe has fought in:

"All battles here are victories for Al-Ghamdi tribe"

Battle of the Qarmatians in 929.

Battle against the Sulayhids in 1063.

Battle against the Seljuks in 1156.

Battle against the Ashraf of Tihama in 1314. Battle aging the Mamluks of Tihama in 1416.

In the year 1433, Sharif Rumaitha bin Ajlan led an army to the country of Ghamid, and his army was defeated, defeated, and Rumaitha was killed in the battle.

In the year 1501, soldiers from Dos and Aws from Zahran and their allies entered from Ghamid Makkah, and they took the blood money of men killed from Zahran after he succumbed to their noble demands.

The period from the year 1638-1670 the Ghamid tribe fought in many wars, including:

In the year 1638: Zaid bin Mohsen invaded the country of Bani Saad in Taif, then he invaded the country of the Ghamid tribe, and the invasion ended with a reconciliation between him and the Ghamid tribe, as some narrators mentioned, but Ghamid defeated Zaid in several locations and among his forces were the Ottoman Janissary forces.  Reference: Circulating poems, and some documents.

also, there were Raids launched by the Ghamid tribe on several tribes:

1- A battle against bni alharth in Bisha: Happened in the seventeenth century that some tribes of Bani Al-Harith went down to Tabalah,, evacuated and took Tabla, which was part of the tribe of Khath’am. Despite the problems between Khath’am and Ghamid, Khath’am asked for assistance from the Hijaz knight Abu Dhahiba bin Jerry al-Ghamdi, who prepared 5 battalions and brought them to Wadi Bisha and from it to Tabalah, and there was a war of response.  The land was for Khath’am and he reconciled between Bani Al-Harith and Al-Faz’, and made a Sirba in the valley led by the knight Salman bin Nami Al-Ghamdi and Ali Amer Al-Ghamdi for a while until things settled between the two neighboring tribes.

2- The battle of 'Asir: The Sharif of Mecca, with his knights from the Ghamid tribe, invaded the Asir regions and subjugated them.

3- The battle of Ranyah, against Subay' tribe:  In the past, a border dispute occurred and some agreements were breached by some members of the Ghamid and Subai tribes in the eastern side of the Ranieh Valley, and due to this skirmishes continued for a period of time that resulted in a mobilization by the two tribes, and the tribes of Ghamid mobilized, and it became a battle that resulted in the victory of Ghamid.

4- Battle against Al-shalawi tribe : This battle  took place after the attack of the tribes of Bani Al-Harith, and most likely it was from Al-Shalawi, after they attacked the commercial convoys of Ghamid heading to Mecca. And when Sheikh Musaed Al-Ghamdi knew,  he led a disciplinary military campaign against Al-Shalawi tribe. The battle ended with the victory of the Ghamid tribe.

In the year 1678, Sharif Muhammad Al-Harith, Sharif of Makkah, used his horsemen (Knights) from Ghamid tribe, with the supervision of the Hejaz and great crowds of Arabs, for the famous battle of (Al-Dhafa’a) between the Sharif of Mecca and the tribes of Dhafir in Al-Qassim.  The battle ended with the victory of the Sharif over them, as the Sharif and his soldiers displaced them and expelled Al-Dhafeer from Najd and Al-Qassim to the regions of the mountain (Jabal Shammar).

At the end of the year 1678 (the Battle of Hadiya), the Sharif, along with Ghamid and Thaqif, attacked and supervised Bani Khalid in and took from them great spoils and killed among the famous Bani Khalid Saqan bin Khalaf Al Mani’ Al Khalidi, the Sheikh of Al Mani’ of Bani Khalid.

In the year 1705 on the 26th of Ramadan, Sharif Saad bin Zaid came out against Sharif Abdul Karim bin Muhammad following a dispute between them. Sharif Saad sought help from Ghamid, and clashed with the defenders in the breach next to Al-Ma’alla. Sharif Saad managed to enter victoriously in Shawwal after the army of Sharif Abdul Karim fled from it.

in 1813, the order was fulfilled by Muhammad Ali Pasha, and the Ottoman Sultan gave him supplies, provisions and weapons, And he was supplying soldiers to the lands of darkness and Asir, and they could not afford it.

The year 1814, where the famous battle in the Quraish Valley at the table between the army of Muhammad Ali Pasha and an army from Ghamid led by the knight / Salih bin Habash and the enemy led by the Turkish / Abdin Bey consisting of twenty thousand fighters and the Turkish army was defeated, so more than a thousand fighters were killed from Muhammad Ali Pasha's army and the Turkish army withdrew to Taif.

At the end of the year 1814, the men of Ghamid invaded the Turk and destroyed an impenetrable fortress for the Turks in the town of Nasiriyah in Balharith, and they seized many weapons, ammunition and horses, and the war plan was so tight that the Turkish fortress quickly fell into the hands of the fighters of Ghamid.

In the year 1815 from today 5 Muharram, Imam Faisal bin Saud descended the town of Turbah with ten thousand fighters, and the Muslims mobilized from the Hijaz tribes and from Ghamid under the leadership of the knight Hamdan bin Hatamel until their number reached twenty five thousand fighters from all the tribes. The Turks and those with them among the Egyptians fought a fierce fight that ended in victory for Faisal and those with him were able to kill a large number of Turkish-Egyptian forces (an estimated five hundred Ottoman soldiers).

In the year 1816, after the return of Muhammad Ali Pasha to Egypt, the tribes of Ghamid and the men of al-Ma'a co-operated

Some of the Asir tribes pushed back the Turks stationed in Tihama and drove them to Taif and to Jeddah.

In the year 1817 the fall of Bani Jarrah, the victory of the village of Bani Jarrah from Bani Zibyan against an army from the Bisha tribes led by Emir Omar Al-Sa'iri, and among the most famous of the dead was Colonel Medawi Al-Qushayri from Bisha.

In 1817, a campaign came by the Turks to burn the market of Ghadana and defeat the Turks at the hands of the sons of Ghamid.

In 1818, the people of the region participated in the campaign of Khalil Pasha and the Sharif Muhammad Ibn Aun, the governor of Makkah

And Solomon Sanjak against Asir.

In 1823, a campaign led by Muhammad bin Aun and Ahmad Pasha came to strike Asir, but it was destroyed from Ghamid in the country of Ghamid.

In the year 1833, Sharif Hazaa bin Aoun landed in Al Baha and warfare him, Ghamid.

In the year 1833, on Wednesday, Ayed bin Mari arrived in Buraidah in the country of Ghamid, and on Thursday, Ghamid bin Mari participated and became Turk in Al Dhafir.

In the year 1837, the tribes of the southern Hijaz rebelled against the Ottoman rule and attacked the Ottoman garrisons in both: Hejaz and Bilad Ghamid, after the arrival of one of the campaigns of the Asir ruler Ayed bin Mari.

In 1838, they participated in Ghamid al-Sharif and defeated the army of Ayed bin Mari.

In 1848, Ghamid Ibn Ayed participated, and they broke the crowd of Sharif.

In 1851, the knight Thamer bin Thamer Al-Yassidi Al-Ghamdi breaks the knights of Sharif Abdul-Muttalib bin Ghalib and takes shelter for camels.

In 1851, the Egyptian Hejaz campaign, which consisted of the Egyptian army, the Hijaz desert, and Harb and Mutair, was defeated at the hands of Ghamid and Asir.

In the year 1864, a campaign came under the leadership of the Sharif of Mecca (Abdullah bin Muhammad bin Abdul-Muin) to retake the Al-Baha region from, but it failed.

In 1870, al-Ashraf led disciplinary campaigns for some tribes, and the Turkish campaign reached Al-Baha

Under the leadership of Sharif Abdullah bin Muhammad bin Abd al-Mu’in Sharif Makkah, and fierce skirmishes took place between the army and the rebellious population, which eventually led to Ibn Ayed’s intervention, and thus Saeed bin Ayed managed to lead the military campaign and entered the country of Ghamid and Zahran, and was welcomed by the men of Ghamid and Zahran.

In 1872, a battle took place in the Al-Baha market between the people of Ghamid and Zahran with the Turkish forces.

The siege of Abha in 1882.

In the year 1895, two murders took place between the tribes of Qahtan and the Turk on one side, and Ghamid and those with them on the one hand, and in them 900 of the Turks were killed and 300 were captured. Among the famous dead was Hussain bin Haif al-Rafidi al-Qahtani, who was killed with the Ottomans from Ghamid in Bilad Ghamid, and Ghamid looted 4 cannons, rifles and a bundle.  And all its eras.

In 1896, several battles took place, most notably:

1. The battle of righteousness against the Ottomans.

2. The battle of Safa Ajlan against the Ottomans.

3. The battle of the sword against the Ottomans.

4. The Battle of the Rush Valley on the Turks.

5. The battle of Wadi Qoub on the Turks.

In 1904, Ghamid joins Al-Sharif in the war against Al-Idrisi.

In 1915, the battle of Hajla against Asir.

The year 1922 put an end to the rebellion led by Hassan bin Ayedh in Asir.

In 1925, Ghamid participated in the battle of Abraq Raghama.

In 1929, the Battle of Hissar bin Fadel al-Maliki and Bani Harb from Bani Malik.

In 1932, the end of the Idrissi rebellion in Jizan.

People
Abdulrahman Al-Ghamdi (footballer, born 1986), Saudi footballer
Abdulrahman Al-Ghamdi (footballer, born 1994), Saudi footballer
Adel Al-Ghamdi, Saudi businessman
Ahmed Alghamdi (soccer) (born 2001), Canadian soccer player
Khalid Al-Ghamdi (born 1988), Saudi footballer
Omar Al-Ghamdi (born 1979), Saudi footballer
Saad al Ghamdi (born 1967), Saudi Islamic scholar
Saeed bin Naser Alghamdi (born 1961), Saudi Islamic scholar
Safar al-Hawali al-Ghamdi (born 1950), Saudi Islamic scholar
Muhammad ibn Musafir the Sallarid ruler of Tarum in modern northwest Iran (before 916–941)

References

Arabic-language surnames
Azd